The  is a DC electric multiple unit (EMU) train type operated by East Japan Railway Company (JR East). It was introduced on 19 March 1991 for use exclusively on the Narita Express, a limited express service linking Narita International Airport with stations in the Tokyo area. The 253 series trains were withdrawn from Narita Express services on 30 June 2010, with two trains redeployed on Nikkō and Kinugawa limited express services from June 2011.

Design
The design was overseen by industrial designer Kenji Ekuan, and the trains were manufactured by Kinki Sharyo and Tokyu Car Corporation. Sets were formed as three-car and six-car units, running as up to 12-car formations in service. From 1 October 2009, all three-car sets were removed from Narita Express operations.

It was the recipient of the 32nd Laurel Prize of the Japan Railfan Club. Extra sets were built in 2002 to cope with the increase in traffic during the 2002 FIFA World Cup. These sets were classified 253-200 series, and included minor improvements over the original 253-0 and 253-100 series sets, such as LED destination indicators, conventional rotating seats in standard class, and 2+1 seating in Green Cars.

Operations

Nikkō/Kinugawa (from June 2011)
 Tohoku Main Line
 Tobu Nikko Line
 Tobu Kinugawa Line
 Yamanote Freight Line

Narita Express (1991–2010)
 Chūō Main Line
 Narita Line (Airport branch)
 Sōbu Main Line
 Yamanote Freight Line
 Yokosuka Line
 Saikyo Line

Variants

1st batch
63 coaches (21 trains in three-car formation) were manufactured in 1990 and entered service in 1991. The types of coaches were the KuRo 253 (Green Car driving trailer), MoHa 253 (trailer) and KuMoHa 252 (driving trailer) coaches. Three-car sets were sometimes joined to form six-car formations.

2nd-4th batches
36 coaches were manufactured in 1992 to 1996 to cope with an increase in passenger traffic on the Narita Express, eventually enabling the 253 series trains to run in 12-car formations as well as the older 3/6-car formations. Minor changes were observed in the interior, notably that the seats had two colours, black and red.

5th batch
The fifth batch of 253 series trains (classified 253-200 series) consisting of two six-car sets, Ne201 and Ne202, were delivered from Tokyu Car in 2002 in anticipation of the 2002 FIFA World Cup which was expected to further increase passenger traffic on the Narita Express. Variable frequency traction systems were built into these trains, and they were fitted with DT69 and TR254 bogies. The interior differed from previous batches, with LED destination indicators, conventional rotating seats in standard class, and 2+1 seating in Green cars.

Formations

6-car sets Ne01–11

6-car set Ne101

3-car sets Ne102–110

6-car sets Ne201–202

Each MoHa 253 car was equipped with one PS26 lozenge-type pantograph.

Interior
The standard-class seating arrangement used in the original 253 series sets was unusual for Japanese limited express trains in consisting of European-style fixed four-seat bays. The seats were later rearranged in a fixed unidirectional layout facing four-seat bays in the centre of each car between 2003 and 2004. The green (first class) cars in the original three-car sets were classified as KuRo 253 or KuRo 253-100.

Retirement
The 253 series trains were gradually replaced on Narita Express services from October 2009 by new E259 series EMUs, with the last trains operating until 30 June 2010. Most trains were subsequently withdrawn and scrapped, but two six-car sets, Ne201 and Ne202, were converted in late 2010 to become 253-1000 series (see below), and two three-car sets, Ne107 and Ne108, were sold to the Nagano Electric Railway (see below).

253-1000 series

The two newest-built sets, Ne201 and Ne202, underwent extensive refurbishment at JR East's Omiya Works and Tokyu Car Corporation's Yokohama factory to become 253-1000 series sets OM-N1 and OM-N2 for use on Nikkō and Kinugawa limited express services jointly operated with Tobu Railway from 4 June 2011, replacing the 485 series and 189 series EMUs currently used. Refurbishment includes entirely new interiors with monoclass seating configured with seat pitch increased from 1,020 mm to 1,100 mm, as well as replacement of main equipment. The total seating capacity for each six-car set is 290. Onboard announcements and passenger information displays is in four languages, Japanese, English, Chinese, and Korean.

Formation
The 253-1000 series sets are formed as follows.

The M2 and M3 cars are each fitted with one PS26A lozenge-type pantograph.

Interior

Resale

Two three-car sets, Ne107 and Ne108, were sold to the Nagano Electric Railway for use on new Snow Monkey limited express services. The two sets, reclassified as 2100 series, entered service from February 2011 after modifications to allow wanman driver only operation.

Other appearances
The 253 series was featured in the train simulator Densha de Go! Final also in Densha De Go! Pocket Chuo line which runs on a (real-life) once-daily Narita Express service on the Chūō Main Line from Takao Station to Shinjuku Station.

References

External links

 JR East 253 series Nikko / Kunugawa 

Electric multiple units of Japan
East Japan Railway Company
Train-related introductions in 1991
Kinki Sharyo multiple units
Tokyu Car multiple units
1500 V DC multiple units of Japan